Jeff Kahn is an American writer and actor. He started out writing for the MTV show Remote Control, and won a Primetime Emmy in 1993 for Outstanding Individual Achievement in Writing in a Variety or Music Program for his work in The Ben Stiller Show. Kahn was married to actress Annabelle Gurwitch from 1996 to 2019. He resides in Los Angeles. He and Gurwitch have one child, a son. He has also written for the Huffington Post.

Filmography

Drillbit Taylor
Tropic Thunder
The 40-Year-Old Virgin
Crazy Ex-Girlfriend
The Ben Stiller Show
The Cable Guy

References

American screenwriters
American male film actors
Living people
Place of birth missing (living people)
Year of birth missing (living people)